Alcyon may refer to a number of things

Aircraft
Morane-Saulnier Alcyon, a French trainer introduced in 1949

Companies
Alcyon a French bicycle, car and motorcycle manufacturer in business 1903–54

Ships
, a LAdroit-class destroyer in service with the French Navy 1929–52
, a French fishing trawler in service 1904–40, requistioned by the Kriegsmarine and served as the harbour defence boat Boot 10 Alcyon 1940–41, and the vorpostenboot V 420 Alcyon 1941–43

See also
Alcyone (disambiguation)